Cummins is a surname. Notable people with the surname include:

 Albert Baird Cummins (1850–1926), U.S. political figure
 Alva M. Cummins (1869–1946), American lawyer
 Anderson Cummins (born 1966),  Canadian international cricketer
 Andrew J. Cummins (1868–1923), U.S. Medal of Honor recipient
 Brendan Cummins (Tipperary hurler) (born 1975), Irish hurling player
 Christopher C. Cummins, an American chemist currently the Henry Dreyfus Professor at Massachusetts Institute of Technology
 Clessie Cummins (1888–1968), U.S. founder of Cummins Engine Co.
 Diane Cummins (born 1974), Canadian athlete
 Francis Cummins (born 1976), English rugby league player
 Frank Cummins (disambiguation)
 George Baker Cummins (1904-2007), American mycologist
 George David Cummins (1822–1876), American bishop and founder of the Reformed Episcopal Church
 Gordon Cummins (1914-1942), English murderer
 Harold Cummins (1893–1976), father of Dermatoglyphics
 Hugh Gordon Cummins (1891–1970), Barbadian politician
 Ida L. Cummins (1853–1918), American women's rights and children's rights activist
 J. David Cummins, American economist
 James Cummins (disambiguation)
 Jeanine Cummins, American author
 Jim Cummins (professor), Canadian academic
 Jim Cummins (ice hockey) (born 1970), retired professional U.S. ice hockey player
 Joel Cummins, American musician
 John Cummins, a number of people including:
 John Cummins (union organiser) (1948–2006), Australian
 John Cummins (Canadian politician) (born 1942), Canadian politician
 John Adams Cummins  (1835–1913), Hawaiian businessman and politician
 John Stephen Cummins, American prelate of the Roman Catholic Church
 Jonathan Cummins, Canadian musician and record producer
 Judith Cummins, British Labour Party politician, Member of Parliament (MP) for Bradford South since May 2015
 Kenneth Cummins, British veteran of the First World War
 Light Townsend Cummins, educator and historian
 Maria Susanna Cummins (1827–1866), American author
 Martin Cummins, Canadian Actor
 Maurice Cummins, Irish politician
 Micky Cummins (born 1978), Irish association football (soccer) player
 Miguel Cummins (born 1990), Barbadian cricketer
 Nick Cummins (born 1987), Australian rugby union player
 Pat Cummins (born 1993), Australian international cricketer
Patrick Cummins (fighter) (born 1980), American mixed martial artist
Patrick Cummins (politician) (1921–2009), Irish politician
Patrick Cummins (piper), Irish piper and tutor
 Paul Cummins, English ceramic artist
 Paul Cummins (basketball) (born 1984), Irish basketball player
 Peggy Cummins (1925–2017), British actress
 Ray Cummins, Irish player of hurling and Gaelic Football
 Ryan Cummins, English cricketer
 Talitha Cummins, Australian journalist
 William Cummins (rugby union), Wales international rugby union player
 William Cummins (Irish politician)
 William Patrick Cummins, Australian politician

See also
Cummings (surname)
Commins (surname)